The Pavelló d'Esports de Reus is an indoor arena located in Reus, Catalonia, Spain. Constructed in 1992, this venue was one of the hosts for the demonstration roller hockey competitions at the 1992 Summer Olympics.

References
1992 Summer Olympics official report.  Volume 2. pp. 337–41.

Venues of the 1992 Summer Olympics
Indoor arenas in Catalonia
Sports venues completed in 1992
Rink hockey in Catalonia